The Church of Saint Sava is a Serbian Orthodox church which sits on the Vračar plateau in Belgrade, Serbia. It was planned as the bishopric seat and main cathedral of the Serbian Orthodox Church. The church is dedicated to Saint Sava, the founder of the Serbian Orthodox Church and an important figure in medieval Serbia. It is built on the presumed location of St. Sava's grave. His coffin had been moved from Mileševa Monastery to Belgrade. The coffin was placed on a pyre and burnt in 1595 by Ottoman Grand Vizier Sinan Pasha. Bogdan Nestorović and Aleksandar Deroko were finally chosen to be the architects in 1932 after a second revised competition in 1926–27 (for which no first award was granted, Nestorović being runner up). This sudden decision instigated an important debate in interwar Yugoslavia which centered around the temple's size, design and symbolic national function. This was accompanied by a sizeable increase in the base area of the ambitiously conceived project. The new design departed from the competition guidelines issued in 1926, and was to replicate the dimensions and architecture of Hagia Sophia.

The first stone was laid in 1935. When Yugoslavia was under occupation in 1941, the construction was approximately ten metres high. The incomplete building was used as a depot by the German army and Tito's partisans. After the war, the Orthodox Church was unsuccessful in its attempt to secure permission to complete the building. Permission was granted in 1984, and the architect Branko Pešić was commissioned to adapt the project to new construction techniques. On May 12, 1985, a liturgy was held at the temple with 100,000 people in attendance. This marked a turning point in the then-communist country; the church had reinstated its position and the communist elite had to back down from a decade-long ban prohibiting the construction of the church. In June 1989, the concrete dome of the temple, weighing 4,000 tonnes and constructed entirely on the ground, was raised to its present position. This was a landmark achievement in construction. 
 
It is the largest Orthodox church in Serbia, one of the largest Eastern Orthodox churches and it ranks among the largest churches in the world. It is the most recognisable building in Belgrade and a landmark, as its dominating dome resembles that of the Hagia Sophia, after which it had been modelled. The church contains a rigorous symmetrical layout with a great sensitivity to light due to its large dome and four apses. The initiative for the mosaic decoration inside the dome was secured by a donation of the Russian Federation, while the larger remainder of the mosaic cladding was successively financed by the Republic of Serbia.

Vladimir Putin of Russia visited the church in January 2019 and announced that the Russian state would finance parts of the remaining works in the mosaic cladding. He symbolically laid a stone in a mosaic with the presentation of the Mandylion. Putin was formally invited to attend the consecration of the church, which was then scheduled for the end of 2020 but the ceremony has not yet occurred owing to the COVID-19 pandemic.

Following the conversion of the Hagia Sophia to a mosque in July 2020, the Patriarch of Serbia Irinej and Serbia's president Aleksandar Vučić in August 2020 expressed their wish the Saint Sava Church would symbolically replace the Hagia Sophia, after which it was modelled, and become a ″New Hagia Sophia″.

In May 2021, the entire Vračar plateau which surrounds the church was declared a spatial cultural-historical unit, and placed under the state protection as the Saint Sava's Plateau. The rationale in government's decision included "symbolical, memorial, cultural-historical, architectural-urban and artistic values of the locality, which represents memory spot of two turning points in Serbian history: Burning of Saint Sava's relics and the First Serbian Uprising".

Site 

The church stands on the Vračar plateau in Belgrade. It is located at the sight axes of the important commercial traffic artery from the old city to the SE outskirts. It is visible from the Ulica Kralja Milana, between Terazije and Slavija Square, which is in extension of the axis. The church is the terminus and landmark of the intended boulevard in the first urban plan of Belgrade made by Emilijan Josimović from the second half of the 19th century. With its architectural form paraphrasing the Byzantine Haghia Sophia, the builders hoped that it will eventually evolve into a universal center of Orthodoxy. Moscow also had at the time lost prominence within Orthodoxy, as the October revolution sidelined religion in Russia and a compensation was intended. The Yugoslav communists also obstructed work on the church, as they banned further construction at the site after World War II. After a long delay, the church rose in 1985. In 2004 all works on the outside had been finished, the expected consecration with the finished interior space is expected to be held at the end of 2020.

The church lies on the western promontory of the Vračar-Plateau at 134 m height. It is located 500 m south of Belgrade's main square, Slavija square. The base of the church is 18 m above Belgrade's traditional geographic center, the Terazije square and the main pedestrian lane, the Knez Mihajlova ulica. It is also 10 m higher than Tašmajdan park, where the second biggest church in Belgrade St. Mark's and the Serbian Parliament, the Skupština are located. As it lies also 63 m above the confluence of the Sava River into the Danube, St. Sava is a primary natural viewpoint and from its massive dome a visible landmark for the city. From the publicly accessible gallery around the dome, a view on the urban fabric of Belgrade is possible. A lift will be installed after interior works are finished for all visitors of the church. 
Below the foundation of St. Sava, pass the double-tubes of the Belgrade rail-commuter network, BG Voz This necessitated a redesign of the original plan of the crypt.

History

Background

Saint Sava (1175–1235), the patron saint and national hero of the Serbian people, was born Rastko Nemanja in 1175, the son of Serbian Grand Župan Stephen (r. 1166–1196). Serbia was still a relatively young nation, having freed itself from the Byzantine Empire in the previous century. In 1077 Duklja became the first Serb kingdom, its founding being intimately interconnected with the establishment of the Roman Catholic Bishopric of Bar. Toward the end of the 12th century, the new state Raška, centered in what is now southern Serbia, rose as a second Serbian nation. Stephen Nemanja ruled Raška. In 1196 he, like his son Rastko before him, moved to the Eastern Orthodox monastic center on Mount Athos in Greece, where he was known as the monk Simeon. Soon afterward, he joined with his son to rebuild the ruined Monastery of Hilandar, on Mount Athos, which had been given to the Serbian people by the Byzantine emperor. Simeon died there in 1199. Sava organized after his return to Serbia the Serbian Orthodox Church and was consecrated the first archbishop of the Serbian church by Patriarch Manul I of Constantinople (r. 1216–1222), the Ecumenical Patriarchate. Sava died in 1236 after his unparalleled second pilgrimage to the Holy Land, Egypt and Mount Sinai, in Veliko Tarnovo in Bulgaria. He was later canonized and named the patron saint of Serbian schools and school-children.

In 1594, Serbs rose up against Ottoman rule in Banat, during the Long War (1591–1606) which was fought at the Austrian-Ottoman border in the Balkans. The Serbian patriarchate and rebels had established relations with foreign states, and had in a short time captured several towns, including Vršac, Bečkerek, Lipova, Titel and Bečej, although the uprising was quickly suppressed. The rebels had, in the character of a holy war, carried war flags with the icon of Saint Sava.

The war banners had been consecrated by Patriarch John I Kantul, whom the Ottoman government later had hanged in Istanbul. Ottoman Grand Vizier Sinan Pasha ordered that the sarcophagus and relics of Saint Sava located in the Mileševa monastery be brought by military convoy to Belgrade. Along the way, the Ottoman convoy had people killed in their path so that the rebels in the woods would hear of it. The relics were publicly incinerated by the Ottomans, on 27 April 1595, as it was placed on a pyre and burnt on the Vračar plateau, and the ashes scattered. According to Nikolaj Velimirović the flames were seen over the Danube.

On the 300th anniversary of the burning of Saint Sava's body, a group of Serbian Orthodox believers founded the Society for the Construction of the Cathedral of Saint Sava on Vračar with the idea of building a cathedral on the site. Initially a small church was constructed and the search began to find an adequate design.

The church is widely regarded as an important symbol of the Byzantine revival architecture, that dominated church architecture from Russia to the Balkans in the 19th and the first half of the 20th century. In particular, it had to serve Serbs as a symbol of the afterlife of the medieval Serbian empire. Especially in the context of Yugoslavia, a Serbo-Byzantine culture was favoured both by the Yugoslav king Aleksandar I Karadjordjević and the Patriarch of the Serbian Orthodox Church. The adoption of a pattern that followed the prototype of the Haghia Sophia in Constantinople illustrates the idea that Serbs are legitimate heirs to imperial Byzantium. Belgrade was visioned as a new imperial center of Orthodoxy, which had a particular resonance in the context of the demise of Moscow being the communist capital when the church was planned.

Planning
Date and location of the Burning of Saint Sava's relics remained disputed. Given years are 1594 and 1595, while the proposed locations, as the name Vračar was applied to the much wider territory than it occupies today, include: Crveni Krst, suggested by  who erected reddish Vozarev Krst at the spot, which gave name to the entire neighborhood of Crveni Krst ("Red Cross"); mound of "Čupina Humka", in Tašmajdan, previously known as Little Vračar, which is the preferred location of modern historians; Vračar plateau, which attracted the widest public acceptance.

In 1894, which was then celebrated as the 300th anniversary of the burning, consensus was reached to build the church on the third plateau location. In 1895 the "Society for the Construction of the Church of Saint Sava on Vračar" was founded in Belgrade. The major part of the parcel donated for the construction came from Scottish missionary Francis Mackenzie, who purchased and developed this part of the city in the late 19th century. By the 1900 ukaz of King Alexander Obrenović, the planned church was declared a "nationwide edifice". A small church was built at the future place of the temple, and it was later moved so the construction of the temple could begin.

First competition 
In 1906, an architectural design competition for the future church was announced. Saint Petersburg Academy of Sciences was authorized to judge the project, and it rejected all five applications as insufficient. A series of wars followed (First Balkan War in 1912, Second Balkan War in 1913, World War I in 1914–1918), which stopped all construction activities. After the war, in 1919, the Society was re-established.

A renewed competition was announced in 1926. The competition rules stipulated that the new church must be in the style of the Serbo-Byzantine architecture, from the period of Prince Lazar (late 14th century). There were 24 submissions. Though the first and third prizes were not awarded, a second-place submission was handed to the architect .

Soon, the project itself, but also the idea of the church and its proposed style became a matter of fierce public debate. In 1905, Croatian sculptor Ivan Meštrović proposed his idea of building the Vidovdan Temple. Fragments of the future building were exhibited in the pavilion of the Kingdom of Serbia at the major Rome 1911 exhibition. The full-scale model was then exhibited by Meštrović in London in 1915. The idea of Meštrović was that epics of all Yugoslav ethnicities are the same and he wanted to represent all "three tribes" (Serbs, Croats and Slovenes) in the monumental temple. He sculpted caryatides for the entrance of the future temple, which are today in the hallways of the National Museum in Belgrade. Meštrović planned to build it at Gazimestan, on Kosovo, between the rivers of Sitnica and Lab.

Second competition 

After World War I, Serbia was integrated into the new Yugoslav State, thus the idea for the memorial church transformed into a more ambitious project. In the second competition a church with a ground area of 60 x 60 m was publicly announced.
A new impetus came from the foundation of an association to build a memorial church on Vračar. The managing board was held by the patriarch Dimitrije. The church was thought to have a built area of 3000 m2, to tower 80 m and offer space to 6.000 faithful. The church was to pay reference to close national building traditions and resemble edifices in late Byzantine art of the so-called "Morava style", highlighting locally built churches commissioned under the reign of Lazar of Serbia (1329-1389) and his successors. The churches from the second half of the 14th century had all a trikonchic floor-plans, a cross-in-square design and some important royal burial places and memorial monasteries were also five-domed. One specification said that only Yugoslav or Russian architects are eligible for entries in the competition. It favoured especially Serbian nationals and Russian émigré architects, who were the main representatives in the neo-Byzantine movement which had graduated at the Vienna Academy of Arts, where Serbian students were lectured by Theophil von Hansen at the end of the 19th century in neo-Byzantine tendencies. They figured prominently in the competition of 1926–27.

The guidelines of the competition stated that the building should be the "greatest and most monumental building in the country, and have ultimate artistic importance".

With the preparation and implementation of the second International Congress of Byzantine Studies 1927 in Belgrade, tendencies of the neo-Byzantine movement culminated in Yugoslavia. The clerical hierarchy sought a church in the tradition of historicism based on classical Byzantine models, more precisely on buildings in the then-called "Serbo-Byzantine Style". The competition marked a climax in neo-Byzantine tendencies in Serbia which saw also the rising of Monastery Gračanica as the ultimate achievement of the late Byzantine architecture and an acclaimed model for the building of the new church on Vračar, even so it was not requested.

It was coincidental that the call for entries was listed on 3 November 1926 in Politika and the competition should be held on 30 April 1927, several months prior to the International Congress of Byzantine Studies 10–14 December 1927. Discourses in the Serbo-Byzantine movement derived not directly from the sphere of architecture, but established here from studies in humanities, which retrospectively sought to highlight the importance of the Byzantine commonwealth to the Serbian cultural tradition. The main proponents came from Russia. With an important Russian émigré community, Belgrade had become after World War I a center of this tendency. Russian émigré architects had become the main architects for public buildings during the reign of the Yugoslav king Aleksandar I, they were located atop the hierarchy and were preferably engaged for building representative government edifices.

The competition itself was not successful, no first-prize winner was announced. None of the entries sufficed the public and professional opinion. Most entries had even not fulfilled the guidelines, most proposed designs were based on models of the Gračanica Monastery as the main representative of national Serbian medieval architecture or even the Haghia Sophia. It is believed that the Jury had recommended the two models. As with the Katholikon of Gračanica, its design was regarded the highpoint of the national architecture, and the competition manifested as the initial point in an evolving discourse about architecture and national identity in Serbian art. Gračanica, even not belonging to the group of memorial monasteries whose royal founders build them as burial places, became a chosen inspiration for the architects. They saw it as a modern source of inspiration in the quest for a true national style.

The second competition saw 22 (24?) entries from major architects in the country. All final proposals had to be submitted before May 1927. Besides Bogdan Nestorović and Aleksandar Deroko, entries came from Dragiša Brašovan, Milan Zloković, Milutin Borisavljević, Branko Krstić and Petar Krstić, Žarko Tatić, Aleksej Papkov, Miladin Prljević, Branče Marinković and Žikica Piperski, Aleksander Vasić and others. The commission had Patriarch Dimitrije, Jovan Cvijić, Andra Stevanović and Bogdan Popović, Pera Popović and Momir Korunović. The commission declined to name a winning entry, as none of the entries had fulfilled the tender criteria. The commission criticised the minor quality of most of the entries.

Public controversy 

Five years after the second competition, 1932, and two years after the new Patriarch Patriarch Varnava took office, the Committee unexpectedly announced that the second-prize entry and the runners-up were chosen to be combined for the final project. That was followed by the similarly unexpected suggestion that the new cathedral should be reminiscent of Haghia Sophia. Bogdan Nestorović's entry 1927 was based upon the Gračanica model and had only touched some elements that resemble the plan of the Hagia Sophia, while the entry of Aleksandar Deroko even more reminiscent of Haghia Sophia was by no means a copy or anywhere close to the appearance of the imperial church. There were additional complaints about the plan to build an immense monument that was to be of national importance for Yugoslavs, given the fact that the cult of Saint Sava was a largely Serbian legacy. Despite the public debate, the realization of the Nestorović-Deroko project took shape after 1932. Vojislav Zađin was chosen as the engineer. Still, construction of the church couldn't start for several more years, in which the architects finalized their plans, as the size of the church and the dimensions grew. The decision process occurred amidst political turmoil, the Yugoslav kingdom became a royal dictatorship in 1929, the Croatian politician Stjepan Radić was killed in parliament 1928 and King Alexander was assassinated in Marseilles, France in 1934, and the idea of integral Yugoslavism died with him. Especially during the hot phase of the debate 1931–32 a paradox happened, after two years of royal dictatorship the state adopted a new constitution (3 September 1931), following a new ideological path to unitarization. At the same time, the pan-Yugoslavian theme in building the church of Saint Sava was dropped, and its function in the Serbian tradition was adopted by the Serbian clergy. By the time the church was to announce the new plans, integral Yugoslavism had been adopted as state ideology, with the parallel decision of the Serbian Orthodox Church, Saint Sava was to represent only Serbian Orthodox believers, a genuine and active counterreaction was established. This path had started immediately after Varnava took office in 1930, vocal support of Yugoslav national unity remained only declarative, as Yugoslavism was meant only in the context of Serbian supremacy and under a Serbian sign.

During the debate, some even pushed for the construction of the Vidovdan Temple instead. Especially vocal was art historian . He and his supporters opted for the "Yugoslav, not Serbian Pantheon". They also rejected the Byzantine design, as it only symbolized "one tribe". Meštrović supported Strajnić, insisting that the new "Yugoslav style" should be created, instead of the sacred architecture that would fit only one of the denominations. King Alexander Karađorđević publicly didn't support any solution, but privately pushed for the Meštrović's temple. The King was a major proponent of integral Yugoslavism and changed the state's name to Yugoslavia. Meštrović, as the most important representative of the idea of the "autochthonous Yugoslav art and architecture", was his favorite artist.

After the 1926–27 competition had no winner, the project remained dormant for three years. The "Society for the Construction of the Church of Saint Sava on Vračar" called the University of Belgrade in 1930 to delegate "two specialists" to join the Society and Nestorović in further elaborating on the design of the church. The faculty proposed two professors, Dragutin Ðorđević, from the architectural department of the Technical University, a known project engineer and Aleksandar Deroko, lecturer at the chair of Byzantine and Old Serbian Architecture. Meanwhile, only Aleksandar Deroko joined Bogdan Nestorović in the fulfilment of the task. Both architects were asked to submit separate new plans based to the new guidelines defined by the technical department of the "Society for the Construction of the Church of Saint Sava on Vračar". On 1 and 2 January 1932 their definitive plans were published for the first time by the newspaper Politika. The plans appeared as images of plaster models for the future church. Both of the new models differed from the previous competition entries of Nestorovic and Deroko in 1927. In contrast to their sketches from 1927, when their entries differed markedly in silhouette, materials, composition and general appearance, the new proposals now looked very similar. References to the national tradition had vanished, neither of the two models was based in any way in design on the "Morava"-churches or Gračanica. The visual difference to the five year older proposals was even substantiated by the information in the accompanying text, where a 33 m measuring dome, which would dominate the church, was quoted. Without doubt the two similar plans had now been drafted authoritatively through the supervision of the society. The two authors acknowledged the Haghia Sophia. The similarity to the Haghia Sophia was apparent, and it did not stem from the authors' preferences, but from authoritative requirements which they had been asked to follow. The obligation set by Patriarch Varnava in 1930, that the church should be reminiscent of Byzantium was now, two years later, fixed in the newspapers' headlines, which stated the "Style was set definitively to be Byzantine". Varnavas and the Society's decision was uncompromising as the newspaper article stated: "With the model of Mr. Nestorović and the model of Mr. Deroko, it was exactly hit what was asked for - the church has to be completely Byzantine, resembling Haghia Sophia in Constantinople".

After this revelation, the newspaper headlines alleged that the Society had deliberately and unexpectedly given "the directive, that the church of Saint Sava should resemble the Haghia Sophia in Constantinople" and that its plan was accepted as the definitive design of the church. This was never denied. Nor the two architects, who accepted their part which they were assigned to. With it, a transition from the 1926-27 guidelines had happened, as Byzantium was now the key element for the identity in which the church would be built.

The resulting final result in the design process was set in the concept of Nestorović whereto certain corrections should be made in collaboration with Alekandar Deroko, which had been decided even before their two models were presented to the public. With this combination, both architects were to make the final blueprint. Despite the publicly announced models not being the final blueprint of the church, the accompanying newspaper text had announced them as the final appearance, which caused an avalanche of negative reactions in the public and among experts. The dispute from a sequence of opinions published by the newspaper Vreme started on 23 January 1931.

After the king dropped his earlier veto on the decision to stop the further planning on the church, the opposing Club of Architects dropped its critical campaign after they were invited to the patriarch. A critical stage of further work occurred in an unstable society from 1932 to 1935. National antagonisms increased and the state saw nine different governments. Under such circumstances the planned church became even more Byzantized, it became a symbol of a political identity and not only an esthetic and stylistic predilection of its planners. The stylistic transformation of its plans to the imperialistic architectural narration is a testimony to the phenomenon which by far surpassed questioning architecture per se and is a mirror to social and political contexts of the state. With it, the episode during which the church was debated, it bears conclusive witness to the drama behind the international political life of Yugoslavia.

Synthetic redraft and invocation of Haghia Sophia 

With the invocation of Justinian's Haghia Sophia the size of the church was even larger than that called for in the initial competition. As they developed their project, Nestoroviċ and Deroko reflected the growing enthusiasm of one part of the population that wanted Belgrade to have one of the largest Orthodox churches in the world. The size, height and weight of the dome were meant to surpass the grandeur of Haghia Sophia. From the initially planned 60 x 60 m, the church had now grown to a square of 80 x 90 m and could hold 10.000 instead of 6.000 worshippers. The diameter of the dome had much enlarged and was to compete with some of the great domed cathedrals of late antiquity, renaissance, baroque and the historicism epoch. As thus the only reference for the synthetic redraft of the Nestorović/Deroko design came from the Haghia Sophia, which possessed a dome that initially had a diameter of 33 m. As it had been the cathedral of the capital city of the Byzantine Empire, its design was naturally imposed on the Belgrade Cathedral, as it was more appropriate for its urban context, than were the minor monastic churches of rural areas. With it, the idea to orient to national tradition was abandoned. This decision was highly criticised by public opinion, but not by the professional public, which didn't find many arguments for the proposal of building such a great church on the basis of the national tradition. The homogeneity of the interior space had come into consideration, which had been so successfully accomplished in the universally acclaimed Haghia Sophia. With the evolution of the model, Nestorović synthesized this with the proposal of Deroko into a final model, which resembled the dimensions of the Haghia Sophia and paraphrased several of its architectural achievements, but had created an interior space of its very own. It had a strictly centrally planned design with four apses which create a very dense, spacious and yet intimate interior. 
As Branko Pešić, who continued the building after the long building ban, described it in 1988:

The adoption of the "Haghia Sophia" was led by impulses from western academic circles and literature, above all French and German, which acknowledged the Byzantine tradition in the rationality of construction from which followed spatial clarity, shown in a logical visually apparent image of the constructive system in the building structure.

Since the beginning of the development of the scholarly discipline of architectural history in Serbia, St. Sophia has been referred to as a superior realization, equivalently in the importance of its constructive solution, structure and spatial effects. This was reasonably a reverberation of the global presentation of this church, whose modern life, from the beginning of the middle of the 19th century, became surprisingly dynamic and complex. The magnetic attraction of its architectural solution boosted towards the end of the 19th century and reached its highest amplitude in Serbia in the interwar years. Owing to its architectural uniqueness, St. Sophia is often regarded as a structure without examples and imitation, though the Justinianian church remained an "archetype-building" - and not in the context of its place in Byzantine architecture, rather as symbol of Byzantine cultural authenticity and partly superiority - from which it gained in importance in the narratives in the relationship between the Byzantine and Serbian identities and in the parentologic metaphor of the link between Byzantium and the medieval Serbian state.

Construction 

Forty years after the initial idea, construction of the church began on 10 May 1935, 340 years after the burning of Saint Sava's remains. The cornerstone was laid by Metropolitan Gavrilo of Montenegro, (the future Serbian Patriarch Gavrilo V). The project was designed by Aleksandar Deroko and Bogdan Nestorović, aided by civil engineer Vojislav Zađina. The work lasted until Second World War Axis invasion of Yugoslavia in 1941.

The church's foundation had been completed, and the walls erected to the height of 7 and 11 meters. After the 1941 bombing of Belgrade, work ceased altogether. The occupying German army used the unfinished church as the Wehrmacht's parking lot, while in 1944 the Red Army, and later the Yugoslav People's Army used it for the same purpose. After that, it was used for storage by various companies. The Society for Building of the Church ceased to exist and has not been revived. Children who grew up in the vicinity, including the future President of Serbia Boris Tadić, didn't know the intended purpose of the unfinished construction, so they played inside thinking it was a ruin of an old castle. The granite slabs, intended for the construction of the church, were used for the building of the Tomb of People's Heroes in 1948, in the Kalemegdan section of the Belgrade Fortress.

Construction ban 

After the end of World War II, the building site was closed due to the changing political situation and the dominant ideological position of communism in the Socialist Federal Republic of Yugoslavia.

Soon after the war, the material and financial possibilities to resume construction were dim. The communist elite identified themselves as atheists and rejected the request of the Serbian Orthodox Church to build the site. The unfinished building was transformed to a playground and even various circus troupes used it for their purposes.

Despite decades of efforts by the Serbian Patriarch German to continue building (and after he made 88 requests from 1958 onwards, of which 82 were sent to the President of Yugoslavia Josip Broz Tito, to which Tito never personally replied) all of them were rejected by government authorities. Permission was finally granted in 1984 when the patriarch was invited to Dušan Čkrebić, President of Presidency of Serbia.

1948 saw the closing of the association to support the building of Saint Sava, her duties were transferred to the board of the patriarchy. In 1953 all belongings of the association to build Saint Sava were confiscated by the Secretary of the Interior Ministry via the decree 2/3-11.855. Even the existing foundation walls were seized and transferred to the people's property.
The decree never arrived at church authorities. Despite this, the church took legal action to counter the nationalisation of its property. In 1962 they were told by the Bureau of Religious Affairs that nationalized property can not be returned to church.

After German had been named Patriarch of the Serbian Orthodox Church in 1958, he personally championed the issue. During his term of office it was one of his main concerns to commence with construction. He sent every month a titular bishop to the mayor of Belgrade, to request the removal of garages and all non-religious objects. After this was achieved, 88 requests were sent to various government agencies, who sent him from "pillar to post", from the lowest state agencies to regional authorities, the agencies of the city and executive organs of Serbian and Yugoslav governments.

On 28 April 1966, the synod of the Serbian Orthodox church was offered by the president of the executive chamber of the Serbian government, Dragim Stamenković, to roof foundation walls and transform them into a church museum or a fresco gallery. As they were aware that no better offer would arrive, they agreed to transform it temporarily into a church museum, but rejected the fresco museum proposal. After that, the communist leader outplayed them, as the communist rulers declared that the church had consented to transfer the decision-making regarding all problems related to Saint Sava to the executive chamber of the Socialist Republic of Serbia. The church even received a changed record of their meeting, as it read that the church had agreed that the locality was to become a "museum of church antiquities" and "fresco gallery" under state supervision. The church, recognising its marginalisation, withdrew its consent and repeatedly demanded to build the planned church. Émigré circles were approached for financial support, which the government dismissed. After the Serbian National Library was erected before the entrance of the building, the church was asked by the president of the Serbian Parliament Dragoslav Draža Marković to relocate its property.

A sudden turn came after Dušan Čkrebić was elected president of the Serbian Collective State Presidency in May 1984. He decided to use a legal loophole. The decision to ban the construction came from the top of the Communist party, and had a status of "political stand" which no one challenged for decades. It was never published by any state, political organ, nor was printed in the State Gazette. Therefore, no changing or abolishing old decrees, or bringing a new one, was needed. He consulted numerous political figures, including President of the Assembly of Serbia Slobodan Gligorijević, secretary-general of the Serbian League of Communists Ivan Stambolić and Slobodan Milošević, then head of the city Communist organization. No one objected, except for the veteran's organization branch in Vračar.

So, on 19 June 1985, Čkrebić informed German and all the members of synod the church had the full right to build Saint Sava as planned on the foreseen place, saying later that he felt this was his "civilizational obligation" and "removal of shame from his generation". Čkrebić suggested to not make his decision public to avoid any counter action and restart work without notifying public. Suddenly all the functionaries, even those in highest positions, which had previously rejected the church building had implicitly tolerated the decision of their younger comrades and remained supportive. Naturally this decision was received as a media bomb and became a public sensation.

On 12 May 1985, 100,000 people gathered in Belgrade to celebrate with the Serbian Patriarch and twenty bishops a liturgy inside the walls of Saint Sava. Still a part of a communist country, the event marked one of the historic turning points that symbolised the fall of communism in Europe. It was a turning point not only for the building of Saint Sava, but also for the demise of the political concept that lay behind the state atheism of communist Yugoslavia. The rising of the building also marked the return of religion to Yugoslavia.

Resuming of work 

Architect Branko Pešić was selected as the new architect of the church. He revised the original plans in order to make better use of new materials and building techniques. Construction of the building began again on 12 August 1985. The original design project proposed a structure composed of masonry and partly reinforced concrete. The state of the existing foundations was learned after detailed investigative work. The four central bell towers were founded on 532 "Simplex" piles, 6 m in depth. The massive perimeter walls are laid on strip foundation 4 m in depth. The quality of the various materials used, i.e. brick, concrete, reinforcement, marble, etc. had been established through investigative work. Detailed survey of the existing structure, the as-built outlines were determined, and served as a starting point for further design and construction work.

From the resumption of construction, the building was re-planned to use a very high level of assembling methods of all parts of the static system, although the complex geometrical shapes of the building made it necessary to use some new and unique methods. As the building was built from pre-assembled concrete slabs, a technological model had to be implemented to provide parallel works, secure quality and build economically. With innovation in the building procedure, the speed of "assembling" the building could be greatly enhanced. Construction was resumed on the level of the original design which used a combination of brick and concrete was cancelled. These lower levels were preserved with the foundation structure, which had to be repaired. The four-wing section had to be separated from the central part by way of expansion joints. Tying up of the foundations, the existing part and the new structure of forthcoming stages were achieved with reinforced concrete columns and tie-beams. Expansion joints in the wing sections were carried out along the line of intersection between the semi-domes and the main arches, and vertically down the bell towers up to the foundations.

The continued construction was designed as a fully prefabricated reinforced concrete element structure. From the geometrically complicated form in view of its structural points, the single elements had to be broken down into precast components outlined with straight lines to the greatest possible extent. Walls had been designed as hollow boxes, which, when assembled, give the building its massive appearance.

All arched shapes of the galleries and vaults were transformed into assemblies of elements curved into two dimensions, which, having been erected, formed three-dimensional shapes. The semi-domes and the dome have been linearized by designing a system of arched trusses and two layers of curved decking. The precast parts were bound into a whole by in-situ cast parts of the structure which provided the required safety and longevity of the building.

The bell towers were initially started as a combination of brick and concrete columns and were continued as concrete box-structures for providing the greatest possible resistance of the towers and the least possible weight. This part of the building was completed by applying the sliding shuttering method (slip-form), with the advantages of prefabrication.

The central part of the building includes four main arches between the bell towers and the central dome with the pendentive underneath and the dome on top. Each arch spans 24 m, which is one of the widest vault spans achieved, as most of the European great domes rest on 8 or 16 pillars. Only Hagia Sophia's dome rests on only four pillars with a span between the arches reaching 31 m. It is still the widest span between the arches of any historical sacral building and still the biggest dome which was erected on only four pillars.

It was found that the type of foundation chosen in the initial design lacked adequate strength to carry the loads imposed from the whole building. With the new materials and design methods, weight was reduced by 30-40 %. Before the lifting of the main dome the "Simplex" piles below the main tower-column had to be improved for carrying gravity and other loads. The foundation pile was partly replaced. While the initial foundation were only 6 m deep, the new ones with 1,4 m diameter reached a depth of 17 m and reached solid rock.

The structural analyses were made with dynamic calculation models using the "TABS" model from Berkely University. All the dimensioning of the elements was done in accordance with European and Yugolsav codes. For the lifting procedures, instruments were placed into the structures to compute the data collected which were analysed by computers. All relevant data was monitored live during the lifting of the heavy assembled elements of the main arches, pendentif and the main dome. Deflection, jack's strokes, leveling of supports, deformations and stresses of main elements were analysed.

Lifting of the dome 

The greatest achievement of the construction process was lifting of the 4,000 ton central dome, which was built on the ground, together with the copper plate and the cross, and later lifted onto the vaulted arches. The lifting, which took 20 days with the specially constructed hydraulic machines, was finished on 26 June 1989.

Before the dome could be lifted, the four main arches had to be brought into place. The four arches are the elements linking the bell towers both physically and in terms of communication. All four pairs of arches were very successfully lifted and fixed into position between January and June 1988. On the outer arches, which belong to the wing section, the semi-domes were formed, each consisting of eight curved, reinforced concrete trusses covered with curved slab decking. The assembly of the arches was done on the ground from pre-fabricated slabs, with their weight of 4000 kN each, they were lifted with "chains" to their intended position. The lifting of heavy loads to great heights was remarkably easily achieved, which as an innovation was a completely new system especially designed for the building. The chains were tested against safety factor of overloading between 1.6 and 2.2. As the expansion-joint arch rests "hanging" from chains in the lifted position, its own columns had to be subsequently cast underneath. They were then relaxed and together with the columns, form a framed system in a "portal" configuration. As the arches are major elements in the structural safety of the dome, they were analyzed in detail in all stages of static live, both in terms of stresses and deflections. The dimensions of the arches were reduced, optimized, so that the resulting structure could become as light as possible for technological purposes, and at the same time strong enough for the lifespan of the building.

The main work was the heavy-assembly-pushing technology in the raising of the main dome. The dome, weighing 4000 tonnes, was lifted by pushing. For the, dome the main gallery, spanning 39,5 m in diameter, which bears the dome and connects to the four bell-towers was prefabricated inside the central square. It sat as a monolith on gravel embankment of 120 cm height.

As thus it could be completed in one phase with the supporting gallery, the dome and the cross and copper covering. Works began in November 1988 and assembly was finished at the end of February 1989. The main dome was assembled from 24 curved, reinforced concrete trusses with two layers of decking forming outer skins around either flanges of the trusses. The bottom decking was intended for mosaic ornament on the inner surface of the dome. The electro-hydraulic lifting equipment prescribed by KMG "Trudbenik" was designed and delivered by the Hydraulic and Pneumatic equipment and devices factory "Prva Petoletka".

The assembly-lifting of the dome structure, with completely executed copper covering works and cross, weighing  from the ground up to the designated position at +40,09 m was done at speeds restricted to 2,5 m/day for safety reasons. Computers led the unity lifting, vertical stepping of 110 mm in one step was realized by application of reinforced concrete slab-cribbing in all reactive supports by robots, which were successively placed under the jacks of the dome. Lifting to 13 m was done with supports passing by the bell-towers in order not to destroy the columns of the galleries. From there, the equipment and support steel (pi shaping) girder were moved into the slits which were left intentionally during the slip-forming of the columns. For each day, casting had to be done in situ around the cribbing slabs in order to finalize 2,5 m of columns per day. The columns were stiff enough for 2,5 m and lifting was restricted to five hours a day.

Over 280 electronic elastomers were placed throughout the dome and its elements, all hydraulic components, were supplied by measurement instruments on information about jack's stroke and jack pressure which were fed to a specially designed computer to control the automatic lifting operation. A fully independent outside electronic leveling system was attached to the computer control, which secured the exact levelling information, and could stop the lifting operation in case of mislevelling greater than 5 mm. One of two working Pc-At clones was collecting and monitoring of over 24 essential data during the performance operation which was finished without mistakes.

The last lifting operations were performed at level +39,69 m, while the top of the dome had reach approximately 80 m in elevation. With the lifting method no risky and complicated assemblies were necessary at this height. All the covering works of the copper sheet on wooden basis and the cross had been performed in March and April, while the dome was still on the ground.

After the lifting of the dome, the pendentive was assembled again at ground level underneath the main dome. It represents the transitional tie element through which the rectilinear plan of the church naos changes to the circular plan of the main dome. With the lifting of the pendentive, the central part of the church was rounded off.

The structural connection between the pendentive and the main dome supports the dome in four positions. It was done by means of hydraulic jacks capable to produce 3000 kN each (12.000 kN in total). The pendentive will suffice for later additional loads from applied mortar, mosaic cladding and marble cladding on the facade.

The pendentive was lifted again by chains. The weight of the pendentive, about 1100 Mp, spanning in perpendicular direction 24*24 m and 14 m height was lifted to 28 m beneath the main dome. This was achieved during two days at the end of January 1990. It was lifted in 36 hours, with speeds at 2,0 m/h. It reached an accuracy within the prescribed technological design with 5 cm tolerance.

With this work the structural part of the church was finished.

Interruption of works 
After the NATO bombing of Serbia in 1999, the works were halted again. Patriarch Pavle, known for his asceticism, thought that such an expensive works are inappropriate when people are beaten and impoverished. After becoming a prime minister in 2001, Zoran Đinđić talked with patriarch and convinced him to continue the works.

Final works 

, the exterior of the church was complete. The bells and windows had been installed, and the façade completed. The Russian Academy of Arts under the guidance of Nikolay Aleksandrovich Mukhin is currently working on the internal decoration. On 22 February 2018, during the presentation of the new internal decoration, the decorated cupola was donated to the Serbian Orthodox Church.

Major Events

Major Services 
 Funeral of Zoran Đinđić (2003): Service held by Patriarch Pavle
 Funeral of Patriarch Irinej (2020): Service held by Hrizostom Jević

Financing 

The financing of the church was accompanied by many problems. During the initial building phase 1935 to 1941 financing was secured through a public association and donations from the king. From 1985 to 1999 public donations and collections were the only available resources. In 2001 Zoran Đinđić reinstalled the association for the construction of the church which worked from 2002 on. In 2004 the exterior of the church would be completed. Greek donations financed the facade, for which marble slabs from the same country were installed. In 2004 Boris Tadiċ took the chair of the association, and at the end of 2004 help from the Russian Orthodox Church was asked for the finalization of the interior. A fundraising event was held at the Cathedral of Christ the Savior in Moscow, where the Russian Patriarch Alesej II welcomed Yugoslav president Tadić and Patriarch Pavle. The concretization of the interior works were discussed with Zurab Tseretelli 2009, In 2009, Russian president Dmitri Medvedev visited the church, asked if Russia was willing to finance part of the interior decoration he replied: "why only a part, when we could do all"?. Vladimir Putin's first visit to the church in March 2011 secured his personal patronage for mosaic works. Patriarch Irenj, asked by Putin's who would decorate the interior, answered "with God's help, we will do it and with Your support" - Putin replied "budet" ("it will be"). State agreement was signed in Moscow 19 March 2012, a presidential decree Pr-1197 from 9 April 2011 enabled holding of a competition for the mosaics. From 2005 the Pošta Srbije collected funds through charity stamps worth 10 Dinar with every item of correspondence. The Serbian government also financed works with budgetary funds. As for 2019, approximately 100 million Euros had been spent on the church: for mosaics 40 million Euros, for other works in the interior 10 million, for the exterior construction approximately 50 million. This totalled roughly 100 million. Of these, 40 million came from government funds, Russia donated 10 million, and the rest was paid through private donations.

Architecture

Exterior 

The church is centrally planned edifice, having the form of a Greek Cross. It has a large central dome supported on four pendentives and buttressed on each side by a lower semi-dome over an apse. Beneath each semi-dome is a gallery supported on an arcade. The general concept is heavily based on the Hagia Sophia. Its main construction idea stems from the central square beneath the dome, it is closely related to the geometry used by Isidore of Miletus and Anthemius of Tralles. The central square in both churches has sidelines of 31 m, resulting in domes with approximately the same diameter (the dome of Hagia Sophia is slightly larger as it extends by approximately 0,5 the central square). The main differences in the dome structure is the high tambour in Saint Sava and that it is double-shelled. The low dome of Haghia Sophia was designed as calotte in which base 40 windows were set. As thus, both domes are built on pendentives at 40 m height, the dome of Saint Sava is approximately 10 m higher (54 to 67 m). The naos of the church is 46 m wide and 46 m long. The space behind the iconostasis will not be public, it is 21,80 wide and 17 m long. The church interior has on three sides narthexes of which two have 9 m depth and 31,70 m width. Within the north and south narthex two small chapels will be created. The narthex to the main entrance in the west is 2 m longer and has four more columns than the other two. Above the narthexes are three galleries with the one of the west side assigned to the church choir. As of 2019 the marble iconostasis is in work and will have six main icons and three doors. On the left and right sides of the iconostasis are bishopric seats.

Its domes have 18 more gold-plated crosses of various sizes, while the bell towers have 49 bells of the Austrian Bell Foundry Grassmayr.

The church has a bigger floor area than Cathedral of Christ the Saviour in Moscow, which covers 3980 m2, compared to 4500 m2 of Saint Sava. Saint Sava is also longer 91 m vs 77,7 m and wider 81 m vs 72,42 m, it also has a bigger diameter of its dome 30,5 m vs 25 m. The dome of the Moscow cathedral is higher so, 77,37 m vs 103,4 m. Interestingly, both cathedrals resemble the Haghia Sophia in its structural design, they've been designed based on the arrangement of the central square in the Haghia Sophia. Thus they exemplify the importance of the imperial Byzantine church for main edifices in Orthodox sacral architecture.

On the inspiration that was drawn from Haghia Sophia, Deroko noted that two guiding principles were followed in designs for the Church of Saint Sava – the imperative of functionality of planning, and the monumentality of space and form. Looking back at the start of construction, Deroko commented on the challenges of designing a functional space for 10.000 people, which was done with reference to the architects' data, the seminal handbook by Ernst Neufert. He also noted information about the thirty-metre diameter of the dome, making an obviously important comparison with the dome of Haghia Sophia. Although the size of Saint Sava is not necessarily associated with monumentality in Deroko's opinion, the appearance and size of the St. Sava's church greatly mattered as it was to be a monument of national importance.

Dome 

The dome of Saint Sava is built in the classical style as a compound dome with four pendentives from a sphere of greater radius than the dome. It has an inner diameter of 30,50 m and an outer of 35,15 m, resembling the dimensions of the Hagia Sophia (it had initially a realized diameter of 33 m). The dome rests on four 40 m-high vaults, the square of the central space below the dome is 39,72 m wide and occupies 1.578 m2. The double-shelled dome is 27 m high and reaches to 67 m on the outside and on its inner side to 64,56 m height. Thus the dome of Saint Sava is slightly higher than its archetype of the Hagia Sophia (56 m). The dome supports a cross weighing four metric tonnes and 12 m height (including its not visible base). Its visible part is 10 m.

After the Hagia Sophia, the dome of Saint Sava is the biggest in any Orthodox church. The celebrated dome of the Hagia Sophia, built by Isidore of Miletus and mathematician Anthemius of Tralles, was initially at 33 m which was reconstructed from the mathematical formulas used by its Byzantine architects. Today, after having been rebuilt three times, it has an elliptic form with the diameters 31,24 m and 30,86 m.

Among all Christian religious buildings, the pendentive domes of Hagia Sophia (33 m, initially realized diameter), St Paul's Cathedral (30,8 m), Florence Cathedral (43 m), St. Peter's Basilica (42 m), Berlin Cathedral (30,7 m), and Primatial Basilica of the Blessed Virgin Mary (33 m) have larger or approximately the same inner diameters to Saint Sava's. Other than Hagia Sophia, none of them were built on four piers and with four vaults. Among the mentioned domes, Saint Sava's has 24 m-wide vaults, only surpassed by Hagia Sophia's (31 m). The much bigger dome of St. Peter's Basilica has main vaults of only 23 m.

If compared to the biggest domes realised in Orthodoxy, Saint Sava surpasses by large the Cathedral of Christ the Saviour in Moscow, whose dome has 29,8 m (outer) and 25 m (inner) diameters, the Kronstadt Naval Cathedral with 29,8 m (outer) and 26,7 m (inner) diameters and the Saint Isaac's Cathedral in Saint Petersburg with 25,8 m (outer) and 21,8 m (inner) diameters.

In addition to its big diameter, the dome of Saint Sava has significant interior height as well. With 65 m (from the floor to the ceiling) it is the fourth-tallest dome (by interior height) of Orthodox Christianity, surpassed only by the domes of People's Salvation Cathedral in Bucharest (104 m), Cathedral of Christ the Saviour in Moscow (69.5 m) and Saint Isaac's Cathedral in Saint Petersburg (69 m).

The dome of Saint Sava also ranks among the tallest domes in the world.

Cross 
The design of the cross is a blend of the conception of the sculptural ideas of Nebojša Mitrić, who was of Jewish descent and a survivor of the Holocaust, and the architectural ideas of Branko Pešić. The 12 m high, 5 m wide and 4 tonnes weighing cross was worked in the organization Modul, it was finished in Prva Iskra, Barić, where Mitrić oversaw the works. Afterwards it was transported to the building-site. Here it was put in a special hangar, where it could be gold-plated. The gold plating was done by Sava and Dragomir Dimitrijević, who did the gold plating for all 18 crosses of the church.

The cross was lifted in May 1989 prior to the lifting of the dome to its presumed location, which was achieved in only 15 minutes. After the cross became visible on the city scape, the media criticised its modernistic design. Mitrić and Pešić used a minimalistic approach, which was not to everyone's taste. But most criticism stemmed from the invocation of the four S, symbolizing a Serbian Heraldic Cross, which was in former Yugoslavia seen as a symbol only of Serbdom. After the attacks, Mitrić, who lost his whole family in the Holocaust committed suicide on 23 August 1989. Later the cross became one of the most copied crosses in the Serbian Orthodox Church and is commonly referred as Sava's Cross. Like Mitrić' previous works, which were famous for their miniature sculpturing (i.e. the medals for the Winter-Olympics 1984 in Sarajevo), the cross' elegance and harmonic shape with a minimalistic conception in the main emblems were unique.

Facade 
The facade of the church was mainly executed in white marble. It covers 12.000 m2. The polished Grecian Volakas marble from Kavalla took 14 months to install. Cornices are made of red Balmoral granite from Finland. It covers 120 m2 on the dome and the half-domes. The pedestal is made of 80 m2 black Jablanica granite from Bosnia. The stones in the facade weigh 3.000 tonnes.

Interior

General information 
The church can hold 10,000 faithful. The choir gallery seats 800 singers.

The church will offer a permanent exhibition about the construction of the church, a bell information gallery and one that informs on the life of Saint Sava. At the northeastern and southeastern pillar, two elevators are being installed to reach the dome galleries. The northern and southern entrance halls have baptism fonts, a third at gallery level is on the northern side of the altar.

The material of the sixteen great columns in the choir were imported from Italy in 1939. The capitals are made of Carrara marble, the columns by green marble from Baveno. The motifs of the capitals were designed by Aleksandar Deroko and were largely executed by Josif Grassi before WW II.

The main iconostasis is made of iron trusses on which slabs of Carrara marble will be installed. The whole construction of the approximately 20 metre-wide iconostasis will weigh 100 tonnes. It will be decorated with mosaic icons. Work on the iconostasis as of August 20, 2020 was in progress. It will consist of one row of icons.

The great central wheel chandelier is the main circular lightning device of the church and will be cast in bronze. With a diameter of 20 m, it will weigh approximately 14 tonnes. The chandelier in Saint Sava will be the greatest and heaviest  of the world. The author of the chandelier is Nikolaj Mukhin, who also designed the mosaic decoration in the church. It will be decorated with wooden icons. The chandelier at 7,5 m above the floor basement in the circular space below the dome will be attached with 12 suspension chains to anchors in the church walls. With its decoration of stylized ornaments it will be reminiscent of the Serbian  of the Middle Ages for which Serbian kings had been royal patrons. The two who at least were commissioned by royal patrons are those from Dečani Monastery in Kosovo and Metohija and Markov Monastery near Skopje which have been preserved until today.

Burials in the crypt
 Irinej, 45th Patriarch of the Serbian Orthodox Church (21 November 2020).

Mosaics

Political implementation 
Information on Russian interests to contribute to the mosaic cladding became public during the 2009 visit of the director of the Russian Academy of Arts, Zurab Tsereteli, to the church. Gazprom Neft was mentioned as sponsor. 2011 saw a state visit of Vladimir Putin during which he announced financial contribution to the mosaics. First assessments showed that 30 million Euros would be necessary for having all the interior done in mosaic cladding. An initial donation of 4 million from Gazprom Neft allowed first stage works in the dome to start. Gazprom deployed a representative to the meetings of the Russian Academy. The central meeting discussing the implementation of works was held on 13 November 2015 in Belgrade. Rossotrudnicestvo and its director, Lubov Nikolaevna Glebova, the designated Russian representative for the interior decoration, were present, as were the president of Serbia and its minister of foreign affairs.
A second tranche over 5 million Euros was guaranteed personally by Vladimir Putin on 17 January 2019 during his visit to the church.

Competition 

Putin advised a decrete, Pr-1197, 29 April 2011 that a state competition could be held in Moscow for the interior mosaic decoration of the Sava Cathedral. It was followed by a state agreement between the ministries of foreign affairs of Russia and Serbia on 19 March 2012. A competition with 50 entries was held in the gallery of the Russian Academy in Moscow, ul. Prechistenka 19, on 23 September 2014. On 5 October 2014, the work of Nikolay Aleksandrovich Mukhin was declared the best. His project was presented to the president of Serbia, the Serbian minister of foreign affairs and the bishop Amfilohije as the representative of the Serbian Orthodox church. Mukhin had chosen the classical Byzantine gold mosaics of the palaiologeen epoch of the 12th century as his inspiration.

Authors 
 
Authors of the mosaics are Nikolay Aleksandrovich Mukhin (Николай Александрович Мухин, *1955), who composed the frescoes in the Cathedral of Christ the Saviour in Moscow, and his fellow Yevgeniy Nikolayevich Maksimov (Евгений Николаевич Максимов, *1948), director of the department of painting at the Russian Academy of Arts in Moscow. The authors scaled a model of the dome at 1:10 in the Russian Academy, which was later installed in the Russian Embassy in Belgrade. Mukhin visited the church for the first time 1994 in official company of Patriarch Alexy II of Moscow who held service with Patriarch Pavle. Alexy returned in 1999 during the bombardment of Yugoslavia. Mukhin later worked in Serbia in various church decorations from 2002. Prior to Saint Sava, his main work in Serbia was the decoration of the church in Ub (Crkva Vasnesenja Hrista) which had to be built anew after an earthquake shook the Kolubara basin in 1998 and where he worked from 2003. He then was a member of the board of cultural advisors to Putin, whom he had known since the early 2000s. Mukhin has painted 18 churches worldwide, four of them in Serbia, despite being a Russian painter, Mukhin stated that he tries to paint close to the culture that the church belongs to. He explained that in 1994 his first idea came to decorate Saint Sava. As the church encloses an immense space, he stated that for him a golden decoration was the only possibility and that it signified the Transfiguration of Jesus. His main task, he said, was to make the church interior shine from its golden surfaces, he as author saw it as symbol to transfiguration. The impression of the light as a medium of sacral illustration will also be enhanced by illumination of certain scenes according to the church calendar. An impulse in the lighting will change from warm to cool tones, dependent on the religious feast. The smelt of the Tessara was made in Moscow and for the golden and silver Tesserae, pure gold and silver were used. Despite having worked in the Moscow Cathedral of Christ the Saviour, the task in decorating Saint Sava was of different magnitude, as the dome and size of scenes are much larger and the artistic media more complex.

Structural implementation 

Realization of the mosaic works began on 28 September 2016 with the visit of Hilarion, director of the church Foreign Office in the Moscow Patriarchate and chairman of the Russo-Serbian commission at the Russian Academy. Zurab Tsereteli, Nikolaj Mukhin, Yevgeniy Maksimov and the acting director to the support of UNESCO, Manana Popova, presented the approved scale model.
The first seating of the commission for the mosaic works to place on 17 March 2017 in the Moscow atelier where the mosaic artwork was created.

Zurab Tsereteli as the coordinator of the artistic works expressed his gratitude to the authors at this first meeting. All mosaics were commissioned in the Moscow atelier in their original size, then cut and transported to Belgrade. The first ten tonnes of mosaics arrived in Belgrade on 3 May 2017. With a working platform at 43 m in the church, the mosaics were lifted with a specially constructed elevator.

The artists of the mosaics were chosen from the Moscow School of Painting, Sculpture and Architecture in Moscow and the Repin Institute of Arts at the Imperial Academy of Arts in Saint Petersburg.

Decoration 
The central mosaic in the dome depicts the Ascension of Jesus and represents Resurrected Christ, sitting on a rainbow and right hand raised in blessing, surrounded by four angels, Apostles and Theotokos. This composition is inspired by the mosaics in the main dome of St Mark's Basilica in Venice. The lower sections are influenced by the Gospel of Luke and the first narratives of the Acts of the Apostles. The texts held by the angels are written in the Church Slavonic language, while the names of the depicted persons are written in Greek. The first indicates pan-Slavic sentiment while the latter connects it to the Byzantine traditions.

It is one of the largest curved areas decorated with the mosaic techniques and when the work is completely finished, Saint Sava will be the 6th-largest church building in the world ornamented this way after St. Peter's Basilica in Vatican City, the People's Salvation Cathedral in Bucharest (also unfinished), the Basilica of the National Shrine of the Immaculate Conception in Washington, D.C, Primatial Basilica of the Blessed Virgin Mary in Esztergom and Berlin Cathedral. The mosaic was created for over a year in Russia, during 2016 and 2017. It was then cut and transported by special trucks to Belgrade. The total weight of the mosaic is 40 tons and it was placed on the dome from May 2017 to February 2018. The 3,289 m2 mosaic installed at the eastern wing section, the side of the altar covers 3,289 m2.

Materials used 
The material for the tessera is produced by Smaltfactory in Moscow. The enterprise's gold mosaics use pure gold (24k). It is reasonable to suggest that for approximately 400 tonnes of mosaic in total, that a great part of the costs comes from the price of precious materials. Beside pure gold, a great deal of the tessera also has pure silver in its content. The pure precious metal content prevents the materials from changing as time passes. Only pure gold's natural colour is not changed by the high temperatures during the smelting process in the kiln. The highly reflective properties of the gold tessera and the differences of angles where the mosaics are installed will produce differences in reflection, a technique that is used to blur the background and constructive elements of a church's interior.

Sculptures 

Capitals and cornices show a variety of sculptures. The heraldic symbols of the Nemanjić-Dynasty are a dominant motif. Floral motifs and anthropomorphic figures are inspired by the rich sculptural tradition of the Morava school. The main author of the stone ornaments of the interior decoration was initially Aleksandar Deroko, whose plans were executed on all of the capitals at the columns between narthexes and naos and the altar apse. They were executed by the Swiss sculptor Josif Grassi prior to WW II. After the long delay during the communist period, the decorative work was overseen by Dragomir Acović and executed by Nebojša Savović Neš. A variety of different white marbles from Italy and Greece, green marbles from Italy, South America and India, dark and bright red marbles from Italy and India, yellow and greenish onyx, white limestone, red and white travertin and blue lapis lazuli. These decorative stones cover 1500 m2.

Plateau 

Discontinuous construction over decades produced numerous mistakes, one of which is the surrounding of the church which remained unfinished and nonfunctional. The construction of the National Library in 1973 affected massively the originally envisioned 1926 design by Deroko and Nestorović. Three architectural design competitions for arranging the plateau which surrounds the church (Vračar or Saint Sava's Plateau) were organized after World War II. One of the rejected but popular designs, Mihajlo Mitrović and Mario Jobst's, was invoked. Using denivelation of the Bulevar Oslobođenja, they envisioned the wide pedestrian connection with the Park Milutin Milanković across the boulevard. Denivelation would also allow for two large garages one of which would be used by the church visitors. The square in front of the temple would have green areas on its rim, and would include the Alley of the Greats (with monuments to all major members of the medieval Nemanjić dynasty), while the section across the boulevard would be adapted into the green, children area.

1990 project 

On the fourth competition, organized in 1989, the project designed by architects Vladimir Macura and Đorđe Bobić was finally accepted in 1990. As with all the other aspects of the church construction, this one was controversial, too, as it was publicly criticized with disputes even reaching the courts of law. Citizens organized in groups and signed petitions against the project under the slogan "We don't want New Belgrade on Vračar, we want small Montmartre around the church". Construction finally began in 2003, and the works were ceremonially opened by prime minister Zoran Živković. The works were pushed in order to be finished by February 2004, for celebration of 200th anniversary of the First Serbian Uprising.

Bobić explained that the design was influenced by the Kalemegdan Park at Belgrade Fortress. Though it was envisioned by the church and politicians as the churchyard, the authors opted for public space, a green square, or even the park. This urban square was also envisioned as the ceremonial site of important events. The conceptualized "walls" of the square were the National Library on one side, and the Parochial Home (clergy house) and the planned Patriarchate Building on another. The building of the National library was designed by Ivo Kurtović and finished in 1973, while the Parochial Home, with facade of shining, white stone, is the work of Mateja Nenadović and his sons Miloš and Đorđe. The Patriarchate Building wasn't built. When built, the Parochial Home was deemed especially problematic, including its location inside the planned green area. It was also deemed too big for its location while the Patriarchate Building, planned in its extension, was deemed even worse as it was to be three times larger. The old Church of Saint Sava remained dwarfed between the new church and the Parochial Home. The cubical design of the Parochial Home remained almost universally disliked.

The traffic around the church was rerouted, with all bordering streets becoming one-way in order to make circling the church possible. The bus stop for public transportation was envisioned in the Skerlićeva street, below the church, but the public transportation line was never established. A parking lot was built behind the library, but only for the library purpose. The architects reject the idea of a large garage, either above or below ground, as the regulation didn't allow it at the time, plus, the authors believed that due to the nature of the object, people should come on foot anyway. Smaller underground garages, for Parochial Home and Patriarchate Building were planned, but never built. Krušedolska Street, along which the Patriarchate Building was planned, was to be expanded to become a "major city thoroughfare". This never happened, but the avenue along the street was cut under the pretext of this plan. The traffic solution was also criticized as some urbanists stated that all of the small streets behind the church should become pedestrian zones, with galleries, coffee and sweet shops, artistic squares, souvenir shops, etc.

The physical churchyard and the public space are divided by the symbolical "living fence", which consists only of columns, with spaces between. The fountain is ornamented with lights. The entire square is used for walking, even the grassy areas, though there are relatively narrow pedestrian paths made of Jablanica marble. To enhance its "friendly" appearance. the plateau is completely flat, except for the mound with the Karađorđe Monument. Almost  of earth was removed from the plateau to flatten it. The plan included the planting of 400 trees, but after the first ones began to dry soon, this was abandoned. The Russian Orthodox Church-donated statue of Saint Sava which was placed on the side facing the street bearing the saint's name. There are two children's playgrounds.

As the result of the accepted plan, even though the new buildings in Vračar and neighboring Neimar were to have only three floors, buildings with six or seven floors were allowed. Urban historians claim that this damaged the inherited urban tissue of Vračar and Neimar. Construction of tall buildings in the narrow, small streets destroyed the neighborhood's ambiance and spirit.

2020 project 

In time, due to the lack of maintenance, the plateau had deteriorated. Among other things, numerous granite slabs, used for paving of the churchyard and the pathways, crumbled and fell out, leaving holes. Scandal broke out during the visit of Russian president Vladimir Putin in January 2019 because of the sloppy repairs by the city communal service. Instead of replacing the missing slabs, workers had even removed some more of them and created patches, filling the holes with asphalt concrete which became laugh of the town.

In January 2020, deputy mayor Goran Vesić announced a complete redesign of the plateau and the construction of the Patriarchate Building. The project was designed by architects Branislav Mitrović and Dejan Miljković. The project wasn't adopted by the city or any experts' commission or jury, but by the Serbian Orthodox Church itself. The central pedestrian pathway is to be expanded and between the library and the new Patriarchate Building an artificial forest, partially growing out of the water, was to be planted. The existing fountain will be dismantled and the new one "will not be a classical fountain". Though city officials claimed that there will be more green areas, from the officially presented architectural model it was obvious that there may be more trees, but less green areas overall. The first, smaller phase on the outskirts of the plateau were planned for October 2020, when the church should finally be finished.

The design was criticized by the Association of Serbian Architects. They stated that the planned “forest” would degrade the historical, symbolical and social importance by reducing the area to the profane city park. It was also noted that mass gatherings organized on the plateau (funeral processions for Patriarch Pavle and prime minister Zoran Đinđić, the visit of Russian president Vladimir Putin) showed that the area's space is inadequate as it is. The massive Patriarchate Building, though planned from the start, is also deemed problematic. It is considered too big and robust for its location. It will also enclose the Krušedolska Street, the tenants in it, and obstruct the view from the street's numerous cafés on the park which has a touristic value. There are calls for keeping the square-like shape of the present plateau or even expanding it as it basically functions as the extended, open-air narthex of the church and should have room for as many visitors as possible as the 1990 design only addressed local residents' needs, neglecting the area's spiritual and religious character.

There were repeated calls for either an international or a domestic public design competition, instead of the clandestine process by which the church itself selected the design of public space.

Further details

Bells 

The church has 49 bells. Four free-swinging bells are in the SW tower. The remaining 45 are part of a carillon, the only ones in the Balkans. All bells were manufactured at the Grassmayr Bell Foundry in Innsbruck, Austria. All bells have been paid for by private donations. The fourth-largest bell is dedicated to Zoran Đinđić during whose presidency the building of the church was restarted after the Yugoslav wars. The biggest bell is a donation of Svetislav Prlinčević for which 110.000 dollars were paid. The carillon plays regularly the hymn of Saint Sava.

Criticism 
 

The architecture of the church has been criticised in several ways through several epochs. It was especially debated after the second competition for Saint Sava in 1926–27, when no first prize was awarded, and after Patriarch Varnava assigned Bogdan Nestorović (1901–1975) in 1930 as winner of a second prize as principal architect to synthesise his plan with Aleksandar Deroko (1894-1988). The result was now asked to resemble the appearance of the Haghia Sophia in Istanbul, which hadn't been a requirement during the competition. The guidelines required an edifice in the Serbian tradition of the late medieval period under Stefan Lazar (i.e. the five-domed churches of the Morava monasteries). Nestorović's own competition entry, based on the most-acclaimed achievement of Serbian medieval architecture, the katholikon of the Gračanica monastery, had also circumvented competition guidelines. Most of the 22 participants had deliberately chosen Haghia Sophia as inspiration. Few entries used modern designs with expressionistic features. Thus Haghia Sophia was the chosen archetype even during the official contest. Most Serbian critics considered this unfitting, as it was not in the national tradition. The universal sacral expression of the Haghia Sophia did albeit fit requirements in the heterogeneous Yugoslav state, which consisted of many different religions and nationalities.

After a criticism campaign started early 1932 in the newsletter Vreme, the most important art debate in the former Yugoslavia began to unfold. It led to the intervention of King Alexander I of Yugoslavia, who approved the reworked plans of Nestoroviċ and Deroko. Nestorović's change of model from "Gracanica" to "Haghia Sophia" is attributed to the new demands of the king and the clerics. The architects had each to present a plaster model at 1:100 scale, that appeared on 6 and 7 January 1932 in the Politika newspaper. Later that year, a new design, the final model, was presented.

Even after this had been adopted, the debate continued. Especially modern art-critics, analyzing the ideological circumstances of the 1930 debate, labelled its appearance clumsy, non-inventive or a reproduction.

Ljubica Jelisavac, art historian and art critic from the University of Arts in Belgrade, noted that the criticism was primarily based on ideological differences between traditionalists and modernists. Thus the real architectural achievement of the building was left marginalized in the debate. It was not even a topic inside art critic and architecture circles, but it wasn't omitted, that the decision to follow a traditionalistic design programme has been partly detrimental for architectural tendencies in Serbia in the interwar period.

Milica Ćeranić defended the architectural achievement and stylistical form. She stated that the well-proportioned and harmonic interior of the church is a result of a cohesion in designing the exterior and the interior. To achieve this, the architects used a rigorously centralized arrangement, which is especially known from early Christianity. The spheric and cubic elements are especially exponentiated - domes, exterior walls, shapes of openings, the stratification of facade surfaces, capitals and columns -  with the excellent mastering of all these elements, apparent in their volume, a memorable impression is given.

She points to the fact that the greatest impression to the percipient lies in the gradual pyramidal composition of the structure, which starts harmoniously from its portals across the conchs and representatively culminates in the dome. Observable at all four sides of the wings, whereby the western, southern and northern are identical, this cascading of the masses is most interesting and has the strongest imprint on the east wing, the side of the altar. The apse is polygonal, or rather pentagonal, thereby showing on its upper surface five small conchs, which correspond to five conchs on the lower side of the east facade. Thereby a synchronized effect in the development of the masses is realized, which are linked in sophisticated wave-like structures, that break the monolithic, square-build forms of the rigid walls.

Italian art critic and professor of Architectural Design at Milan University, Pier Paolo Tamburelli, praised the building. He claimed that the building possesses an incredibly pure and dignified interior. With its large dome and with its four apses it has a unified and well-developed, profound and dense space. While based on classical examples, Tamburelli notes its own ferocity and gentleness which is expressed in the sensitivity to light. 

Tamburelli notes that he wonders if it would be possible to reproduce a theory capable of re-appropriating the resources that have been used to build Saint Sava, and whether it would be possible to find all necessary design techniques to build a construction theory on it, as its classical design layout was laid in subtle casts and shades of concrete slabs.

The church has been compared to Sagrada Familia because of their long-running construction phase and their cultural and artistic importance. And both churches have served for liturgy during their lengthy construction.

Arts 
Pošta Srbije depicted on 14 November 2019 a floorplan and Aleksandar Deroko on a stamp to commemorate his 125th birthday.

See also
 Religious architecture in Belgrade
 List of buildings in Belgrade
 List of carillons
 List of tallest buildings in Serbia
 List of largest Eastern Orthodox church buildings
 List of tallest Orthodox church buildings
 List of largest church buildings
 List of tallest church buildings
List of tallest domes

Notes

Annotations

References

Sources 
 Aleksandar Deroko 1985: Nastavak radova na zidanju crkve Svetoga Save. Godisnjak grada Beograda, 32: 193–198.  (PDF)
 Dušan Arbajter 1992: Saint Sava Temple: heavy building assembly application. IABSE, Congress Report. (PDF)
 Pier Paolo Tamburelli 2006: Hram Svetog Save, the Concrete Cathedral. Domus, 898, December 2006, 68–71.

 Milica Ceranic 2005: Neovizantijski elementi u arhitekutri Hrama sv. Save na Vracaru. Misa Rakocija, Nis I Vizantija: zbornik radova, III, 397-412 (PDF)
 Ljubica Jelisavac 2019: Institucionalni aspekti konkursa za Hram Sv. Save (1926) i njihove konsekvence. pp 82–83 (PDF)
 Documentary from RTV - "Hram za blagoslov srpski" - Director: Marina Zorić, 2019 (52:17 min)

External links

 English-language documentary of the Yugoslav „Filmske Novosti“ (1989) about the lifting of the Dome by IMG „Trudbenik“ via the lift-slab method (YouTube: English)
Official site 
Webcam 

Serbian Orthodox churches in Belgrade
Church buildings with domes
Churches completed in 2009
20th-century Eastern Orthodox church buildings
Byzantine Revival architecture in Serbia
Saint Sava
Vračar